Phaphama Fojela (born 28 August 1984) is a South African cricketer. He was included in the Border cricket team for the 2015 Africa T20 Cup.

He was the joint-leading wicket-taker in the 2017–18 Sunfoil 3-Day Cup for Border, with 26 dismissals in nine matches. In August 2018, he was named in Border's squad for the 2018 Africa T20 Cup. He was the leading wicket-taker for Border in the 2018–19 CSA 3-Day Provincial Cup, with 31 dismissals in seven matches. In April 2021, he was named in Border's squad, ahead of the 2021–22 cricket season in South Africa.

References

External links
 

1984 births
Living people
South African cricketers
Border cricketers